Eder Peti (born 3 April 1989) is an Albanian football player who played for KS Elbasani in the Albanian First Division. The defender has also managed to score in the Albanian Superliga with Elbasani in 2008–2009 season.

Club career 
He has featured in just 2 games for Elbasani in the Albanian Superliga and has scored one goal which came on 23 May 2009 in a 3–2 win over Teuta Durres, Peti opened the scoring in the 36th minute after an assist from Eleandro Pema.

References 

1989 births
Living people
Association football defenders
Albanian footballers
KF Elbasani players
Kategoria Superiore players
Kategoria e Parë players